Cacochroa permixtella is a moth of the family Depressariidae. It is found in the Mediterranean Region.

Biology
The caterpillars feed on Phillyrea angustifolia and Phillyrea latifolia. They initially mine the leaves of their host plant. The mine has the form of a narrow, full depth corridor, lined with silk. The mine often follows a vein for a long time. Most frass is ejected out of the mine. Pupation takes place outside of the mine. After overwintering in the larval stage, the larvae live freely in a rolled leaf.

Taxonomy
Junior synonyms are:
 Anchinia permixtella Herrich-Schaffer 1854
 Cacophyia permixtella (Herrich-Schäffer, 1854)

References

External links
Fauna Europaea

Cryptolechiinae
Moths described in 1854
Moths of Europe
Moths of Africa
Moths of the Middle East